Micheal Owusu known as DJ Mic Smith is an event, club, radio, mixtape and artist DJ and also an entrepreneur from the republic of Ghana.

He also currently holds 4 awards and 6 nominations; 2 awards with 4syte TV for DJ of the year, The Redbull club DJ of the year award and Best Mixtape DJ with Ghana DJ Awards. 
Mic Smith is also the official DJ for EL signed to the highly successful Ghanaian record label BbnZ live.

Early life 
Micheal was born on February 23 in Accra as the youngest of 4 siblings. Raised in the busy part of town, He grew up in awoshie attending the well recognised and prestigious school, Wesley Grammar School  (popularly referred to as WES G) where he initially planned to pursue a career in journalism...

Career

The Beginning 
Mic began DJing by “accident” when looking for a job over 6 years ago, where he had an embedded passion for music and allowed this to take more of a forefront in his life than it had previously. At Hot fm (93.9) in the early stages of 2008, he started as a radio presenter who presented the entertainment news on the Drive Time Show hosted by Okyeame Quophi.  Within a year of life in the media world. Mic began spinning, his talent was pushed to the next level, when he became resident DJ at one of the most recognised clubs in Accra, Rockstone's Office known to many as Django. Over the years he was the main focus entertainment at the club and his talent on the decks quickly earned him the nickname ‘The Shutdown King’ exposing him to many opportunities including national and international gigs.

Latter moves in His career 
With his growing popularity, Mic has seen many huge events come his way, from huge concerts to private events nationally. He has shared the stage with the likes of Sarkodie, Stonebwoy, Shatta Wale and more. In 2014 he made one of the biggest moves in his career as the event DJ for Ghana's most prestigious music awards ceremony- Vodafone Ghana Music Awards.  He has also since featured on national TV, with a spot on the New Day morning show on the Tv3 network channel. Mic's work has even gone beyond the boundaries of Ghana giving him international recognition, reaching countries such as Kenya, South Africa and the UK.

Mixtapes 
Beyond the scope of his work at events and clubs, Mic is also a recognized and talented mixtape DJ, with recent releases including his unique Shutdown riddim release in collaboration with Yellow Moon Records which pioneered a new way of Ghanaian DJs collaborating with artists. The riddim featured 12 individual tracks from the following Ghanaian artists: BET Best International Act Africa 2015 winner: Stonebwoy, MzVee, AK Songstress, Choir Master, Vybrant Faya, Eye Judah, Trigmatic, Mr. Eazi, Episode, Shatta Rako, Aphecktion and Mighty Faya. 2015 pre-birthday release- ‘Rushing’- featuring Kwaw Kese, ‘We Just Landed’ featuring EL, C-real, Stargo, Gemini and Joey B, ‘I no Get Time’ featuring Manifest, American Passport refix ft E.L. and one of his earliest mixtape releases called the ‘Da reminda’ featuring E.L and Scientific. The latter obtained an award for best mixtape DJ 2012 at the Ghana DJ awards 2013.

Radio 
Off late, Mic was also made one of the host DJs on the youthful Ghanaian radio station, y (107.9) FM in 2014 having previously begun his radio career the previous year as one of the new hottest recruits on Live 91.9 Fm. He currently is on air with Kojo Manuel on the DrYve every Monday to Friday from 3 PM to 7PM .

Discography

Singles

2012 
 'Da Reminda' ft E.L and Scientific

2013 
 Go Ur Way' ft E.L and Edem

2014 
 'Tonga' (Dj Mic Smith intro) ft Joey B and Sarkodie 
 'I no Get Time' ft Manifest
 'We Just Landed' ft C real, E.L, Joey B, Gemini and Stargo
 'American Passport' (shutdown refix) ft EL and Joey B

2015 
 'Rushing' ft Kwaw Kese
 'Shutdown riddim' ft Stonebwoy, MzVee, AK Songstress, Choir Master, Vybrant Faya, Eye Judah, Trigmatic, Mr. Eazi, Episode, Shatta Rako, Aphecktion and Mighty Faya

2016 
 'Olele' ft Zeal, Yaa Pono & Cabum 
 'Panda (Afro Urban Remix)' ft Teephlow & Desiigner 
 'Work (Afro Urban Remix)' ft Rihanna and KOJO CUE 
 'Love Yourself (Afro Urban Remix)' ft Adina & Justin Bieber

2017 
 'Dutty Wine' ft Itz Tiffany and Ceeza Milli 
 'Wild Thoughts (Afro Urban Remix)' ft DJ Khaled, Rihanna, Joel Orleans, Bryson Tiller

2018 
 'Yenkor' ft Kwesi Arthur
 'Jama' ft Patoranking & Shaker

2020 
 'Juju' ft Ckay, Kweku Afro, T ́neeya, J.Derobie, Blaqbonez, Pappy Kojo

Mixes 
2013
 Birthday Mix
 Afro explosion
2014
 Missile Riddim
 Made in Ghana Mix 2
 Shutdown Mix 2 (Afrobeatz)
2015
 Twenty fourteen Hits Vol 1

References

Ghanaian DJs
Living people
Musicians from Accra
Year of birth missing (living people)